This is a list of Spanish television related events in 2002.

Events 
 11 February: The final of the Talent Show Operación Triunfo is followed by 12.873.000 viewers (68% share).
 25 May: Rosa López performing the song Europe's living a celebration represents Spain at the Eurovision Song Contest 2002, that took place in Tallinn, ranking 7th. The show is followed by 12,750,000 viewers (80,4% share).
 18 July: José Antonio Sánchez is appointed General Director of RTVE.

Debuts

Television shows

Ending this year

Foreign series debuts in Spain

Births 
 31 March - Priscilla Delgado, actress.

Deaths 
 16 January – Alfonso del Real, actor, 85.
 21 January – Adolfo Marsillach, actor, director and writer, 73.
 27 January – Mari Carmen Prendes, actress, 95.
 10 March – Iran Eory, actress, 64.
 28 March – Juan Guerrero Zamora, director, 75.
 10 July – María Massip, actress, 59.
 29 August – Luis Carandell, journalist, 73.
 27 November – Juan Viñas, journalist, 84.
 13 December – Juan Rosa, actor, 50.

See also
 2002 in Spain
 List of Spanish films of 2002

References 

2002 in Spanish television